Gyrotoma is a genus of extinct freshwater snails with an operculum, aquatic gastropod mollusks in the family Pleuroceridae. This genus was endemic to the USA.

All of the species within this genus are presumed extinct. They were native to the main channel of the Coosa River in Alabama, where the last suitable habitat was destroyed by the filling of the reservoir Logan Martin Lake in the mid-1960s.

Species 
Species within the genus Gyrotoma include:
 Gyrotoma excisa (I. Lea, 1843) - excised slitshell
 Gyrotoma lewisii (I. Lea, 1869) - striate slitshell
 Gyrotoma pagoda (I. Lea, 1845) - pagoda slitshell
 Gyrotoma pumila (I. Lea, 1860) - ribbed slitshell
 Gyrotoma pyramidata (Shuttleworth, 1845) - pyramid slitshell
 Gyrotoma walkeri (H. H. Smith, 1924) - round slitshell

References

Further reading 
 Goodrich C. (1924). "The genus Gyrotoma". Miscellaneous Publications University of Michigan, Museum of Zoology, 12: 1-29.

Pleuroceridae
Extinct gastropods
Taxonomy articles created by Polbot